Inchkhe is a rural locality (a selo) in Novokayakentsky Selsoviet, Kayakentsky District, Republic of Dagestan, Russia. The population was 195 as of 2010. There are 2 streets.

Geography 
Inchkhe is located 19 km north of Novokayakent (the district's administrative centre) by road. Pervomayskoye and Karanayaul are the nearest rural localities.

Nationalities 
Dargins, Kumyks and Azerbaijanis live there.

References 

Rural localities in Kayakentsky District